Lahu (autonym: Ladhof ) is a Tibeto-Burman language spoken by the Lahu people of China, Thailand, Myanmar, Vietnam and Laos. It is widely used in China, both by Lahu people, and by other ethnic minorities in Yunnan, who use it as a lingua franca. However, the language is not widely used nor taught in any schools in Thailand, where many Lahu are in fact refugees and illegal immigrants, having crossed into Thailand from Myanmar.

Distribution by dialect
Lahu Na (Black Lahu) is the northern and standard Lahu dialect and is spoken in most of Yunnan, China, in Kengtung District of Shan State, Myanmar and in most parts of Thailand. It should not be confused with Lahu Aga (Black Lahu of Laos (See below) or Kucong (Black Lahu of Vietnam).

Lahu Phu (White Lahu) is the southern and most spoken dialects of the Lahu language. It is spoken all five countries wher it is spoken, including in Muong Te District of Lai Châu Province.

Lahu Nyi (Red Lahu) is only spoken in Thailand, including in the southern Yala Province.

Lahu Aga (Black Lahu) is spoken in Bokeo Province and Yunnan (Xishuangbanna).

Classification
The Lahu language, along with the closely related Kucong language, is classified as a separate branch of Loloish by Ziwo Lama (2012), but as a Central Loloish language by David Bradley (2007). Lahu is classified as a sister branch of the Southern Loloish branch in Satterthwaite-Phillips' (2011) computational phylogenetic analysis of the Lolo-Burmese languages.

Dialects

Matisoff (2006)
A few dialects are noted, which are each known by a variety of names:
 Lahu Na (Black Lahu, Musser Dam, Northern Lahu, Loheirn)
 Lahu Shi (Yellow Lahu, Kutsung); the divergent  dialect is spoken in Nanduan 南段村 Village, Nuofu Township 糯福乡, Lancang County, China
 Lahu Nyi (Red Lahu, Southern Lahu, Musseh Daeng, Luhishi, Luhushi), Shehleh
 Lahu Shehleh

Pham (2013)
Phạm Huy (2013:13) lists the following 3 branches.
 La Hủ Phu (White Lahu): only found in Lüchun County, Yunnan, China
 La Hủ Năk (Black Lahu)
 La Hủ Nê Thu

Yunnan (1998)
Yunnan (1998:280) lists 5 Lahu dialects.
Lancang (standard) dialect 澜沧标准音区片 (in most of Lancang, Ximeng, Menglian, Cangyuan, and Shuangjiang counties)
Nanmei dialect 南美土语群片 (in Nanmei Township 南美乡, Lincang County; Gengma County, and other nearby areas)
Mojiang dialect 墨江土语群片 (in Pu'er, Simao, Mojiang, Xinping counties, etc.; Lahu Shi)
Menghai dialect 勐海土语群片 (in Menghai, Jinghong, Mengla, Lancang counties (in Jiujing 酒井, Yakou 雅口, Qianliu 谦六 townships, etc.); Lahu Shi)
Jinping-Lüchun dialect 金绿土语群片 (in Jinping and Lüchun counties)

Traditionally Lahu folk taxonomy splits the Lahu people into the two groups of Black Lahu and Yellow Lahu; Red Lahu and White Lahu are new dialect clusters originating in messianic movements within the past few centuries. Black Lahu is the standard dialect in China, as well as the lingua franca among different groups of Lahu in Thailand. However, it is intelligible to speakers of Yellow Lahu only with some difficulty.

Bradley (1979)
Based on the numbers of shared lexical items, Bradley (1979) classifies the Lahu dialects as follows:

Common Lahu
Black Lahu
Shehleh
(Core)
Black Lahu proper
Red Lahu
Yellow Lahu
Bakeo
Banlan

Lama (2012)
Lama (2012) gives the following tentative classification for what he calls Lahoid.
Lahoid
Lahu-Xi (Yellow Lahu)
(Black Lahu cluster)
Lahu-Na (Black Lahu)
Lahu-Ni (Red Lahu)
Lahu-Pu (White Lahu)
Lahu-Shehleh

Jin (2007)
Jin Youjing (2007) classifies the Lahu dialects as follows.

Lahu Na 拉祜纳 (Black Lahu 黑拉祜): about 80% of all Lahu
Xia'nanxian 下南现 (Nanling Township 南岭乡) dialect
Dongkahe 东卡河 (Laba Township 拉巴乡) dialect
Lahu Xi 拉祜西 (Yellow Lahu 黄拉祜): about 20% of all Lahu
Northern dialect: Donghe 东河, Xincheng 新城, Qianliu 谦六, Wendong 文东, Fudong 富东, and Dashan 大山 townships
Central dialect: Yakou 雅口, Qianmai 谦迈, and Yingpan 营盘 townships
Southern dialect: Southern Nuofu 糯福(南), Northern Nuofu 糯福(北), and Huimin 惠民 townships
Lahu Alai 拉祜阿莱: located in Alai Dazhai 阿莱大寨, Fubang Township 富邦乡, Lancang County and a few other nearby villages
Kucong 苦聪: located in Jinping, Lüchun, Zhenyuan, and other counties

Jin Youjing (1992) covers Lahu linguistic geography and dialectology in detail.

Heh (2008)
Heh (2008)<ref>Heh, Sa Mollay Kya. 2008. ;;A sociolinguistic comparison of Lahu Aga with Lahu Na. Master’s thesis.</ref> lists Lahu Shi (Yellow Lahu) dialects as:
Mikeng
Nakeo
Lahu Aga (also called Aphubele; spoken in Laos)
Bakeo
Balan

Lahu Aga was classified as Lahu Shi by Bradley (1979), but Heh (2008) found that it is actually linguistically closer to Lahu Na (Black Lahu). In Laos, there are about 9,000 Lahu Aga located in Bokeo Province (Tonpheung district, Muang Muang district, Houj Xai
district, and the special region of Nam Yut) and Luang Namtha Province (Vieng Phoukha district, Boten district, and Muang Long district) (Heh 2008:161). In Laos, the Lahu Aga are most numerous in Tonpheung district (in Baan Dong Keap, Baan Sam Sip, Baan Khi Lek, Baan Beu Neong, Baan Hoe Ong, and Baan Nan Fa villages) and Vieng Phoukha district (in Baan Na Kat Tai, Baan Na Kat Neua, Baan Pamak, Baan NaNoi, Baan NaVa, Baan NaPhe, and Baan Na Shin villages) (Heh 2008:161-162). The Yellow Lahu are also called Lahu Kui Lung in Laos (Schliesinger (2003:110), with Kui meaning 'people'. There are about 21 Lahu Aga villages in Bokeo and Luang Namtha provinces, including in Ban Don Keao, Bokeo, and Ban Na Kat Neua, who had originally migrated from Yunnan, China. (Heh 2008:8). There are also 11 Lahu Aga families living in Baan Son Pu Nong, Chiang Saen District, Chiang Rai Province, Thailand. Heh (2008) provides comparative Lahu Aga dialectal data for:
Na Kat Neua village, Vieng Phoukha district, Luang Namtha province
Don Keao village, Tonpheung district, Bokeo province
Na Kha village, Muang Muang Township, Bokeo province

Phonology

 Consonants 

 Palatal consonant sounds when occurring before a close central vowel  are heard as dental affricate sounds . Stop sounds may also be heard as palato-alveolar sounds  elsewhere, in free variation.
  may also be heard as a velar fricative , in free variation.
  before , can be articulated as a palatal nasal .

 Vowels 

 When following palatal or labial consonants,  have special allophones .

 Tones 

Sound changes
Lama (2012) lists the following sound changes from Proto-Loloish as Lahu innovations.
 *s-l- > x-
 *z- > dz-
 *ŋ- > x-

Grammar
Lahu is a typical Tibeto-Burman language.

See also
Kucong language

 Notes 

 Sources 
 
 
 Phạm Huy (1997). Một phần chân dung: dân tộc La Hủ (nhật ký điền dã)''. Lai Châu: Sở văn hóa thông tin Lai Châu.

Further reading

External links 

 
 Radio Soap Opera in Lahu Language

Loloish languages
Languages of Yunnan
Languages of Myanmar
Languages of Thailand